Clipyn Du is a mountain in northern Powys in Wales. Also known as Tarren Bwlch-Gwyn or Siambwr Trawsfynydd, it is one of the higher summits of the area and is located a few miles north of Pumlumon. Tarren Bwlch-Gwyn is the name of a steep-sided escarpment nearby. It is classed as a HuMP, having over 100 metres of Topographic prominence. Nearby is a lake, Glaslyn.

External links
 www.geograph.co.uk : photos of clipyn du and surrounding area

Mountains and hills of Powys